The Arthur W. Woodson House is a historic house at 1005 West Arch Avenue in Searcy, Arkansas.  It is a single-story brick building, with a broad gabled roof across its main section.  A cross-gabled porte-cochere extends to the right, supported by brick piers, and a hip-roofed porch extends across the front, with a projecting gabled section in front of the entrance, making for a picturesque and irregular roof line.  The house was built in 1923, and is considered one of the city's finer examples of Craftsman architecture.

The house was listed on the National Register of Historic Places in 1991.

See also
National Register of Historic Places listings in White County, Arkansas

References

Houses on the National Register of Historic Places in Arkansas
Houses completed in 1923
Houses in Searcy, Arkansas
National Register of Historic Places in Searcy, Arkansas
1923 establishments in Arkansas
Bungalow architecture in Arkansas
American Craftsman architecture in Arkansas